Ethel D. Jacobs (March 18, 1910 - November 9, 2001) was a prominent American Thoroughbred racehorse owner/breeder who was a three-time leading owner in North America.

Married to U.S. Racing Hall of Fame trainer Hirsch Jacobs, Ethel Jacobs used salmon pink and green racing silks. She and her husband owned Stymie Manor, a horse breeding operation in Sparks, Maryland. She owned and raced a number of successful horses trained by her husband and her son. Ethel Jacobs was the leading owner in North America in 1936, 1937, and 1943. Among her notable horses were:
 Stymie - 1975 United States' Racing Hall of Fame, retired as the world's leading money-earner
 Searching  - 1978 United States' Racing Hall of Fame
 Affectionately -  1989 United States' Racing Hall of Fame
 Personality, won the 1970 Preakness Stakes, voted American Horse of the Year
 High Echelon,  won the 1970 Belmont Stakes

A racing family
The Jacobses' son, John, trained horses including Personality and High Echelon. Son Thomas also bred horses, and daughter Patrice married Louis Wolfson. They owned Hail To Reason and  the 1978 U.S. Triple Crown champion Affirmed.

Ethel and Hirsch Jacobs maintained homes in Forest Hills, Queens, and Bal Harbour, Florida. She died in 2001 of pneumonia at Mt. Sinai Hospital in Miami Beach at age 91 and was buried in the Gate of Heaven Cemetery, Hawthorne, New York.

References

Sources
 June 26, 1961 Sports Illustrated feature story on the Jacobs family
 New York Times November 11, 2001 death notice for Ethel Jacobs
  November 10, 2001 Thoroughbred Times article titled Owner Ethel Jacobs dies in Florida at 91

1910 births
2001 deaths
American racehorse owners and breeders
Owners of Preakness Stakes winners
Owners of Belmont Stakes winners
Burials at Gate of Heaven Cemetery (Hawthorne, New York)
People from Forest Hills, Queens
People from Yonkers, New York